Monika Ryniak (born 24 January 1960 in Myślenice) is a Polish politician. She was elected to the Sejm on 25 September 2005, getting 2193 votes in 13 Kraków district as a candidate from the Law and Justice list.

See also
Members of Polish Sejm 2005-2007

External links
Monika Ryniak - parliamentary page - includes declarations of interest, voting record, and transcripts of speeches.

1960 births
Living people
People from Myślenice
Members of the Polish Sejm 2005–2007
Women members of the Sejm of the Republic of Poland
Law and Justice politicians
21st-century Polish women politicians
Polish schoolteachers